Urquhart is a Scottish surname. It is a habitational name, that can be derived from any of four places with the name. Other places named Urquhart, including one by Loch Ness, are derived from the Brythonic elements ar, meaning "on", "by"; and cardden, meaning "thicket". The Scottish Gaelic form of the surname is Urchardan.

Notable people named Urquhart

Academics 

Alasdair Urquhart (born 1945) Scottish professor of philosophy
Francis Fortescue Urquhart (1868–1934), English academic
Kenneth Trist Urquhart (1932–2012), American historian and 27th Clan Urquhart chief

Arts
Craig Urquhart, American pianist and composer
Felicity Urquhart (born 1976), Australian country music singer-songwriter
Jim Urquhart, America photographer and photojournalist
Isabelle Urquhart (1865–1907), American stage actress and contralto
Mary Cora Urquhart (1859–1936), American actress
Molly Urquhart (1906–1977), Scottish actress
Murray Urquhart (1880–1972), British artist
Natalie Urquhart, Canadian film and television producer
Philippa Urquhart, British actress
Robert Urquhart (1922–1995), British actor
Shari Urquhart, American fiber artist
Tony Urquhart (1934–2022), Canadian artist

Business
A. William Urquhart, American lawyer, partner in Quinn Emanuel Urquhart & Sullivan
Alistair Urquhart (1919–2016), Scottish businessman and author
David Urquhart, Baron Tayside (1912–1975), Scottish businessman
Diane Urquhart, Canadian financial analyst
Lawrence Urquhart LLB, CA, (born 1935), Scottish businessman
Leslie Urquhart (1874–1933), Scottish mining entrepreneur
William Muir Urquhart (1855–1933), American businessman

Clergy 

 Colin Urquhart (1940–2021), British evangelical and neocharismatic Christian leader
 David Urquhart (born 1952), Bishop Church of England

Government 

 Brian Urquhart (1919–2021), British civil servant, United Nations official
 Frederic Urquhart (1858–1935), Australian police commissioner
 John Urquhart (born 1947), American sheriff
 Margery Urquhart (1912–2007) Chilean deputy director of Social Work, first female Special Branch agent

Military 
Ronald Urquhart (1906–1968), British Army officer
Roy Urquhart (1901–1988), British Army general

Politics
Alexander Urquhart (died 1727), Scottish politician
Anne Urquhart (born 1957), Australian politician
Carl Urquhart Canadian politician
David Urquhart (1805–1877), Member of Parliament, Scottish diplomat, writer
Diane Colley–Urquhart, Canadian politician 
Don Urquhart (1848–1911), Australian politician
Duncan Urquhart, (died 1792), British politician
Earl Wallace Urquhart (1921–1971), Canadian politician
Elias L. Urquhart (1846–1934), American politician
Glen Urquhart (born 1948), American politician
James Urquhart (1822–1901), American politician
Jean Urquhart (born 1949), Scottish politician
John Urquhart (1844–1933), Canadian politician and doctor
Martin Luther Urquhart (1883–1961), Canadian politician 
Stephen H. Urquhart (born 1965), American politician and founder of The Divine Assembly
Thomas Urquhart (1858–1931), Canadian politician
William Pollard-Urquhart (1815–1871), Irish politician and writer

Science and technology
Erin Urquhart, American applied environmental scientist who manages the NASA PACE Project
Feargus Urquhart (born 1970), American video game developer and CEO of Obsidian Entertainment
Fred Urquhart (1911–2002), Canadian zoologist
George Macdonald Urquhart (1925–1997), Scottish parasitologist
Roderick B. Urquhart, mathematician and namesake of the Urquhart Graph

Sports 
Billy Urquhart (born 1956), Scottish football player
David Urquhart, American hockey coach
Donna Urquhart (born 1986), Australian squash player
Duncan Urquhart (1908–1956), Scottish football player
Fiona Urquhart (born 1987), Scottish cricketer
Gavin Urquhart (born 1988), Australian rules football player
George Urquhart (born 1950), Scottish footballer
John Urquhart (1921–2003), English cricketer
Johnny Urquhart (1925–2008), Scottish football player and administrator
Max Urquhart (born 1942), Australian rules football player
Mike Urquhart (born 1958), Canadian ice hockey player
Stuart Urquhart (born 1995), Scottish footballer
Thomas Urquhart (baseball player) (born 1949), American baseball player

Writers and journalists 
Fred Urquhart (1912–1995), Scottish author
Ian Urquhart, Canadian journalist and newspaper editor
Jane Urquhart (born 1949), Canadian author
Jeannie Urquhart, known as Georgie Raoul-Duval (1866–1913), author, lover of Colette and Colette's husband Henry Gauthier-Villars
Jessie Urquhart (1890–1948), Australian journalist and novelist
Paul Urquhart (1877–1940) pseudonym for author Ladbroke Black
Rachel Urquhart, American author
Thomas Urquhart (1611–1660), Scottish writer, translator of Rabelais

Fictional characters named Urquhart 
Abby Urquhart, character in Howards Way television show
Dr. Ethan Urquhart, titular character in Lois McMaster Bujold's novel Ethan of Athos
Francis Urquhart, character in BBC political thriller House of Cards and the Netflix remake House of Cards
Francis Urquhart, a character in the series of novels by Michael Dobbs, the first of which is House of Cards
Gerald Urquhart, character in Howards Way television show
Gordon Urquhart, character in the 1983 film Local Hero
Sir Hector Gore-Urquhart, character in the 1957 film Lucky Jim
Julius Gore-Urquhart, character in the 2003 ITV film Lucky Jim
Uncle Gore-Urquhart, wealthy philanthropist in Kingsley Amis' novel Lucky Jim
Norman Urquhart, character in Dorothy Sayers' mystery novel Strong Poison
Polly Urquhart, character in Howards Way television show
Stella Urquhart, character in the 1983 film Local Hero
Urquhart, a Hogwarts' student and captain of the Slytherin Quidditch team in book Harry Potter and the Half-Blood Prince

See also
Clan Urquhart

References

External links 

Scottish toponymic surnames
Scottish Gaelic-language surnames